Barabanki district is one of the five districts of Faizabad division (officially Ayodhya division), in the central Awadh region of Uttar Pradesh, India. Barabanki city is the administrative headquarters of Barabanki district. Total area of Barabanki district is 3891.5 Sq. Km.

Barabanki district is situated between 27°19′ and 26°30′ north latitude, and 80°05′ and 81°51′ east longitude; it runs in a south-easterly direction, confined by the nearly parallel streams of the Ghaghara and Gomti. It borders seven other districts of Uttar Pradesh. With its most northern point it shares borders with the Sitapur district, while its north-eastern boundary is defined by the Ghagra, beyond which lie the districts of Bahraich district and Gonda district. Its eastern border is shared with Faizabad district, and the Gomti forms a natural boundary to the south, dividing it from the Amethi district. On the west, it adjoins the Lucknow district.

In 1856, the district came, with the rest of Oudh State, under British rule. During the Indian Rebellion of 1857, the whole of the Barabanki talukdars joined the mutineers, but offered no serious resistance following the capture of Lucknow.

Barabanki district stretches out in a level plain interspersed with numerous lakes and marshes. In the upper part of the district the soil is sandy, while in the lower part it is clay and produces finer crops. The district is fed by the rivers Ghaghra (forming the northern boundary), Gomti (flowing through the middle of the district), Kalyani and Rait and their tributaries, for the major part of the year. Some rivers dry out in the summer, and become flooded during the rainy season. The changing course of the river Ghagra alters the land area of the district.

The principal crops are rice, wheat, pulse and other food grains and sugarcane. Both of the bordering rivers of Barabanki are navigable. The district roadways include connections to National Highway 28, state highways and various link roads.

Etymology

The area was once known as Jasnaul, from Jas, a Raja of the Bhar tribe, who is said to have founded it before 1000 AD. Following the Muslim conquest, the lands were divided into twelve, with the new owners quarrelling so incessantly that they were called the Barah Banke, or twelve quarrelsome men. Banka, in Awadhi, means a bully or brave. Others derive the name from ban, meaning wood or jungle, and interpret Barabanki as the twelve shares of jungle.

History
The current Barabanki district was first established by the British upon their annexation of Oudh State in 1856. Originally, the district was known as Daryabad district because its headquarters were at Daryabad, but in 1859 they were relocated to Barabanki. The name "Barabanki" was chosen for the district's official name over "Nawabganj", then the more common name of the town, for two reasons: first, to avoid any possible confusion with other places called Nawabganj, and second, because the civil station was technically located outside of Nawabganj in the small revenue village of Barabanki. Previously, under the Nawabs of Awadh, the area that would become Barabanki district was divided between five chaklas: Daryabad-Rudauli, Ramnagar, Dewa-Jahangirabad, Jagdispur, and Haidargarh.

Early history and legends
Barabanki district is mostly within what was the Pachhimrath division of the kingdom of Rama.

Parijaat tree is a protected baobab tree in the village of Kintoor, and is considered sacred to Hindus. Located near the Kunteshwar Mahadeva temple (established by Kunti), the tree is said to grow from Kunti's ashes. The tree is very old, though its age has not been scientifically determined.

Before 1000 AD, Jas, a raja of the Bhar tribe, is said to have founded the locality of Jasnaul which later became Barabanki.

Medieval India

Muslim Infiltration was first tried in what is now the district at Satrikh, in 1030 AD (421 AH). The Muslim conquest saw Sihali attacked and its Hindu sovereign killed, ]. Bhar-Pasi chief Raja Sohil Deo (or Sohel Dal) of Sahet-Mahet and Rathor monarch Sri Chandradeo of Kannauj fought a battle in Satrikh village of the district and drove out the Foreign Muslim Army in the Battle of Bahraich.

In 1049 AD (441 AH), the kings of Kanauj and Manikpur were again attacked but the foreigners were defeated and driven away from Oudh. The Muslim invasion was not successful in Bara Banki as elsewhere. 
After, Tarain 1192, Moslems again attacked this region and Ayodhya but were not very successful till the reign of Khiljis and Firoz Tuglaq.The foreigners followed a policy of religious persecution and conversions. They also settled many foreigners and gave them fertile tracts in Ramnagar, Daryabad, Zaidpur, Rudauli areas.

From 1350 to about 1750 AD, Muslim immigrants settled in great number in the district. The Muslims first permanently settled in Oudh.

Rudauli was occupied , in the reign of Alla-ud-din Khilji, whose forces had destroyed nearly every remaining seat of Chhattri power. Rasulpur was conquered about 1350 AD. Daryabad was founded about 1444 AD by Dariab Khan Subahdar and his brother Fateh Khan colonized. Fatehpur. The villages of Barauli and Barai, near Rudauli, were occupied and became large estates until about the middle of the fifteenth century.

Simultaneously, however, with this latter immigration of the Muslims, there was one of Chhattris. The mysterious tribe of Kalhans, which numbers some twenty thousand persons, are said to be descended from Achal Singh, who came in as a soldier of fortune with Dariab Khan about 1450 AD. Singh had large properties, with a possible capital at Bado Sarai on the old bank of the Ghagra.

The wars had by then shifted to fighting between Muslim princes, with Hindu soldiers employed. The battleground was the Oudh borderland between Sharqis of Jaunpur (where Ibrahim Shah Shargi reigned) and the Lodis of Delhi. Dariab Khan settled Hindu soldiers as garrisons. Oudh clans, said to have emigrated from Gujarat, included the Kalhans, the Ahban, the Pan war, the Gahlot, the Gaur, and the Bais.

The isolated Suryavanshi estate of Haraha and the Sombanshi Bahrelia estate of Surajpur were established by small colonies of Kshatriya foot-steps soldiers.

Mughal era (1526–1732)
During Akbar's reign, the district was divided under the sirkars of Oudh, Lucknow and Manikpur. Ain-i-Akbari mentions the following parganas (administrative units) during the reign of the Akbar:

Nawabs of Awadh (1732–1856)

Newal Rae, the naib of wazir Safdar Jang, was defeated and killed at the Kali river by the Bangash Afghans of Farukhabad, who then overran the province except a few of the fortified towns. In 1749 AD, Jang with an army of 60,000 men was defeated. The Mughal authority might have been overthrown had the Oudh Chhattris revolted at this time, but they waited until Jang had bribed or beaten the Rohillas out of the country in 1750 AD (1164 AH).

The tribes gathered themselves together under the leadership of Raja Anup Singh of Ramnagar Dhameri, the Janwar of Balrampur, the Bisens of Gonda, and numerous other lords. The forces assembled for an attack on Lucknow, whose troops had gone into Rohilkhand. The Shekhzadas of Lucknow came out to meet the enemy, joined by the Khanziidas of Mahmudabad and Bilahra, who were connected with them by marriage.

The Musalmans, headed by Nawab Muizz-ud-din Khan of Mahmudabad, were victorious in battle at Chheola Ghat on the Kalyani, on the road to Lucknow. The Balrampur raja was killed and some 15,000 were killed or wounded on both sides. The Khanzadas then rose to power. The Raikwars were proportionately depressed; the estates of both Baundi and Ramnagar were divided, and but a few villages left with the raja. The process of agglomeration commenced again , on the death of Saadat Ali Khan II. In 1856, the Ramnagar raja had recovered the family estate and added to it, while his brother of Baundi had similarly added 172 villages to his domain.

There were a total forty-three taluqa. The principal chiefs of Bara Banki during the last years of Nawabi were:
 Taluqa of Ramnagar – The large property of 253 villages belonged to Raja Sarabjit Singh. The raja was the head of the Raikwar clan, which immigrated to Oudh from the hill country of Kashmir .
 Taluqa of Haraha – Owned by Raja Narindr Bahadur, the head of the Surajbans Thakurs. He was the son of Raja Chbatarpat Singh, and both were afflicted with mental incapacity. Certain members of the Raja's family held the estates of Ranimau Qiampur in a separate qubuliat in the Nawabi, and thus escaped being placed under the taluqdar's sanad.
 Taluqa of Surajpur – This estate comprised fifty-six villages. The proprietor was Udatt Partab Singh, the head of Bahrelia. He was mentally and physically unfit to manage his estate, but so long as his maternal grandfather, Udatt Narain, lived there was no fear of under-proprietors, tenants or patwaris defrauding the family.
 Taluqa of Jahangirabad – The taluqdar was a Qidwai Sheikh, Raja Farzand Ali Khan. He inherited the property through marriage to the daughter of Raja Razzaq Bakhsh.
 The late Raja Singji was a formidable and violent landholder until he was attacked by Maharaja Man Singh with Captain Orr of the British company's frontier police. They killed almost 70 of his inmate robbers. He was captured and taken prisoner to Lucknow, where he died in jail. Many of his inmate robbers escaped and migrated to neighbouring districts. It was mainly owing to the bad example set by Singji that the Daryabad district was so turbulent under the native government, that amils and chaklas were to use a native expression unable to breathe in it (Nak Mein Dam Karta Tha).
 Farzand Ali was the inspector in charge of the Sikandarbagh at Lucknow. On one occasion of the last king of Oudh visiting the garden, he was struck with the appearance of this young man, and presenting him with a khilat, directed him to attend at the palace. With such a signal mark of the royal favour, Farzand Ali's advancement was rapid, and, under the interest of the influential eunuch, Bashir-ud-daula, he obtained a farman designating him the Raja of Jahangirabad. This taluqdar followed the deposed king to Calcutta and was there during the mutinies. Raja Farzand Ali was very intelligent and well able to manage his estate with prudence and circumspection.
 Taluqa of Barai – Chaudhri Ghulam Farid, a Siddiqi Shekh, was the largest landholder of the Rudauli tahsil. He owned thirty-nine villages. In the settlement at annexation, he gave half of the estate to the children of his cousin, Mumtaz Ahmad.
 Taluqas of Rudauli and parganas of Bhitauli, Daryabad and Surajpur were other important settlements.
Few other later important taluqas were:
 Taluqa of Usmanpur – Founded by Raja Kaunsal Singh, who obtained the estate for military service under the Mughal Emperor Humayun. His son Lakhan Singh converted to Islam, and took the name Lakhu Khan.
 Taluqas of Satrikh – This estate comprised 85 villages. It had been ruled by the Chaudharys, descendants of the original Usmanis who immigrated to Oudh in the early part of the millennium. They were dispossessed for resistance to the British during the 1857 rebellion, and Satrikh estate was ruled by Taluqdar Qazi  Kazi Ikram Ahmad.

Rebellion of 1857
Unlike what occurred in the districts of Hardoi, Gonda, and Lucknow, the whole body of the taluqdars in this district joined the cause of the deposed king and the mutineers. They offered no resistance, however, of any moment to the advance of the British troops after the capture of Lucknow in the battle of Nawabganj.

British Raj (1858–1947)

The Sadr station (district headquarters) was placed at annexation and also after the mutinies at Daryabad. However, due to the stagnation of water in the immediate vicinity of the town, and to the prevalence of fever, the headquarters was moved in 1859 to Nawabganj, Bara Banki.

During 1869 census of Oudh, thirteen large towns or kasbahs were identified in the district:
Nawabgunj,
Musauli,
Rasauli,
Satrikh,
Zaidpur,
Sidhaur,
Dariabad,
Ichaulia,
Rudauli,
Ram Nagar,
Bado Sarai,
Kintoor and
Fatehpur. The census also noted the following were tahsils and parganas:

In 1870, before the addition of two parganas from Lucknow (i.e. Kursi & Dewa) and one pargana each from Rae Bareli and Sultanpur (i.e.

In 1871 about half the district was held by 43 talukdars; there were also 5,397 village zemindars (landowners), and 1,354 under-proprietors. The talukas were as follows:

In 1877, Barabanki was one of the three districts of the then Lucknow division.

As per 1877 Gazetteer of the province of Oudh there were:
 Four tehsils:
 Nawabganj
 Ram Sanehi Ghat
 Fatehpur
 Haidergarh
 Nine thanas:
 Nawabganj
 Zaidpur
 Tikaitnagar
 Sanehi Ghat
 Bhilsar
 Fatehpur
 Kursi
 Ramnagar
 Haidergarh
 Courts, following were officers with civil, criminal and revenue powers:
 a deputy commissioner
 two assistant commissioner
 three extra assistant commissioner
 four tehsildars
 four honorary magistrates

Independence movement

In the struggle for independence from 1922 to 1934 during the Khilafat movement, the district participated in the growing movement against foreign fabrics, etc. On 26 October 1942, Brij Bahadur and Hans Raj ( Sardar) planted a bomb in a police outpost at Barabanki, known as Barabanki Outpost Bomb Case.

Geography
Barabanki district is for the most part flat agricultural lands studded with groves. These lands are undulating and richly wooded, while to the south there is a gentle slope down to the Gomti. The district is intersected at various parts by rugged ravines.

Rivers and waters

Ghaghra
The principal river in the district is the Ghaghra at a short distance from Bahramghat; it is formed by the Himalaya-fed rivers Chauka and Sarda, which meet in the Fatehpur tahsil. For , the river divides the Bara Banki district from the districts of Bahraich and Gonda. It flows in a south-easterly direction past Faizabad, and empties into the Ganges at Arrah. This river is navigable for flat-bottomed steamers as far as Bahramghat, and is used by country boats in considerable numbers between Bahramghat and Sarun district. The principal ferries are at Kaithi, Kamiar, and Paska Ghat; a floating bridge operates at Bahramghat during the cold season. The river's flood plains generally have fine crops of rice, but the water sometimes lies too long after the rains and rots them, and the spring crops cannot be sown. The river is not utilized for irrigation.

Gomti
Next in importance is the Gomti, which runs through the tahsil of Haidargarh and some portion of the tehsil Ram Sanehi Ghat, and separates the Bara Banki district from the districts of Lucknow, Sultanpur and Faizabad. The circuitous course of the Gomti covers  though the direct distance is half that distance. It is therefore not very efficient for transportation, though there is considerable traffic by country boats. Its water is at a lower level than the Ghagra, and it is not used for irrigation.

Kalyani
The Kalyani River rises in the Fatehpur tahsil, and empties into the Gomti near the village of Anarpatti. In typical monsoons, the maximum discharge is about three-quarters of this.

Jamuriha and Reth

The Jamuriha and Reth, both in the Nawabganj tehsil, are the only other notable streams in this district. Their general characteristics are the same: they have significant flows during rains which have carved steep and rugged banks broken by innumerable ravines. They flow into the Gomti. Haidergarh, Deviganj, Choury and Alapur are settlements on the Reth, while Jamuriha passes through Barabanki city (Barabanki revenue village on one side and Nawabganj Tehsil hq on other).

Tanks, jheels and wetlands
There are numerous tanks and jheels, especially in the tehsils of Daryabad, Ram Sanehi Ghat, and Nawabganj. Seven percent of the area is covered with water; many of the tanks are in course of being deepened, earth is removed to replenishing cultivated land, though such efforts are complicated by conflicting rights to the tanks. Some of the jheels are navigable by small boats for sport or pleasure. Parva, Nardahi, and Ganhari Jheel are the major wetlands.

The Gomti-Kalyani doab
It is bounded by the Kalyani river to the north, the Gomti river and its tributary to the south, the Sarda Sahayak feeder channel to the west, and the confluence of the Gomti and Kalyani rivers to the east.

Administration and divisions

Barabanki is one of the five constituent districts of Faizabad Division. The other districts being Faizabad, Sultanpur, Amethi and Ambedkar Nagar. The division is headed by the divisional commissioner.

As of 2003–04, the district contained 7 tehsils, 17 development blocks, 154 nyaya panchayat and 1,140 gram sabhas.

As per 1991 data, there were 1,812 inhabited villages and 31 inhabited villages.
In 2001, there were 14 towns and cities, 2 nagar palika parishads, 1 cantonment area, 10 nagar panchayats and 1 census town.

Land administration 

Barabanki District is divided into six subdivisions, popularly known as tehsils: Nawabganj, Fatehpur, Ramsanehi Ghat, Haidergarh, Ram Nagar and Sirauli Ghauspur. The District Revenue Administration is headed by the District Collector (also known as District Magistrate), with the office at the collectorate, and these tehsils are under the charge of sub-divisional magistrates.

Development 

District-level developmental activities are coordinated by the Chief Development Officer whose office is at the DRDA at the collectorate. The district-level offices for monitoring the developmental activities of Blocks at Barabanki are located at Vikas Bhawan. Block development officers, who head each of the 15 development blocks of the district, carry out the development schemes on behalf of the government. The development blocks are: Banki, Masauli, Dewa, Harakh, Fatehpur, Haidergarh, Dariyabad, Suratganj, Siddhaur, Pure Dalai, Nindura, Trivediganj, Ram Nagar, Sirauli Ghauspur and Banikodar.

Law and order

The law and order administration is jointly coordinated by the District Magistrate and the Superintendent of Police. The district is subdivided into 22 police stations (thanas), each of which is headed by an inspector or sub-inspector of police. 12 police stations are rural and 9 are rural. These police stations are: Haidergarh, Satrikh, Dariyabad, Baddupur, Dewa, Kursi, Zaidpur, Mohammadpur, Ram Nagar, Fatehpur, Safderganj, Kotwali, Ramsanehi Ghat, Asandra, Subeha, Tikait Nagar, Lonikatra, Masauli, Kothi, Ghungter, Badosarai and Jahangirabad

Urban

The district has 14 urban administrative bodies for its towns, which are:
 Nawabganj Nagar Parishad for Barabanki Town
 Fatehpur Nagar Panchayat for Fatehpur Town Area
 Zaidpur Nagar Panchayat for Zaidpur Town Area
 Dariyabad Nagar Panchaya for Dariyabad Town Area
 Ramnagar Nagar Panchayat for Ramnagar Town Area
 Satrikh Nagar Panchayat for Satrikh Town Area
 Haidergarh Nagar Panchayat for Haidergarh Town Area
 Dewa Nagar Panchayat for Dewa Town Area
 Siddhaur Nagar Panchayat for Siddhaur Town Area
 Tikaitnagar Nagar Panchayat for Tikaitnagar Town Area
 Rudauli Nagar Parishad for Rudauli Town
 Banki Nagar Panchayat for Banki Town Area
 Cantonment Board for Cantonment Area in Barabanki
 Rampur Bhavanipur Census Town
 Subeha Nagar panchayat for Subeha town (effective 2008)

Electoral

Parliament and State Assembly

Barabanki district has seven state-assembly constituencies which fall under two parliamentary constituencies. They are:

State Assembly

Sitting  (As of 2021):
 Sakendra Pratap Verma, 266-Kursi, BJP
 Sharad Kumar Awasthi, 267-Ramnagar, BJP
 Dharamraj Singh Yadav, 268-Barabanki, SP
 Upendra Singh, 269-Zaidpur, BJP
 Baijnath Rawat, 272-Haidergarh, BJP
 Satish Chandra Sharma, 270-Dariyabad, BJP

State Council
Barabanki district sends two members to state-council. Sitting members are:
 Rajesh Yadav 'Raju'
 Ram Naresh Rawat

Basic amenities

Following is the list of public amenities (1999–2002 data):

Road transport
National Highway 28 (NH-28) passes through the district. It is well connected to other cities by means of roadways. Passenger road transport services in Uttar Pradesh started in 1947 with the operation of bus service on the Lucknow–Barabanki route by UP Government Roadways.
 Bus Station/Bus Stop 93

Railway

Communication services
 Urban Post Office 26
 Rural Post Office 339
 Telegraph Office 19
 Telephone Connections 25691

Public distribution system
 Rural fair-price shops 1094
 Urban fair-price shops 118
 Bio-gas plants 4645
 Cold storage 16

Electricity
 Total electrified villages 1103
 Total electrified towns/cities 13
 Electrified Schedule Caste localities 1149

Water supply
Area covered under water supply using taps/ handpumps of India Mark-2:
 Village 1812
 Towns/city 14

Demographics

According to the 2011 census, Barabanki district had a population of 3,260,699. It then ranked 107th out of India's 640 districts). Its population growth rate over the decade 2001–2011 was 26.40%. Barabanki had a sex ratio of 887 females for every 1,000 males, and a literacy rate of 47.39%. Scheduled Castes made up 26.51% of the population.

As per the report Provisional Population Totals Paper 1 of 2011 Uttar Pradesh Series 10 of the 2011 India Census, Barabanki district ranked 28th out of 71 districts of UP by population, with 1.63% of the state's total. In 2001 census it ranked 32nd. Population density is ranked 46th, with an increase from 623 in 2001 to 739 in 2011. The district was 56th for literacy, with overall literacy rate of 63.76%. Indian census, 2011 in its Provisional Population Totals report for Uttar Pradesh gives following stat for the district:

Annual Health Survey 2010-11 gave following stats for the district:

As per Annual Health Survey 2010-11 district's stats for wealth index were:

As per AHS 2010–11, the district's effective literacy rate was 67.6 (rural 66.5, urban 80.9); for males it stood at 77.1 (rural 76.4, urban 85.8) and for females it was 56.9 (rural 55.3, urban 75.3).

1.518% of total population had some form of disability. Per 100,000 persons, the rate of severe injury was 188, major injury was 122, and minor injury was 423. Out of 100,000 persons, 691 were suffering from diarrhoea/dysentery, 966 were suffering from acute respiratory infection (ARI), 3,698 suffered from some kind of fever, 139 were suffering from diabetes, 418 were suffering from hypertension, 234 were suffering from tuberculosis, 578 were suffering from asthma/chronic respiratory diseases, and 801 were suffering from arthritis. 5,592 suffered from an acute illness. 98.3% of those suffering from acute illness received treatment (6.6% from a government source). 5,036 had symptoms of chronic illness, of which 83.1% sought medical care. 4,964 were suffering from any kind of chronic illness of which 45.5% received treatment (20.3% from a government source).

18.3% of population was having habit of chewing tobacco while 1.1% were in habit of chewing without tobacco. 15% of population smoked, and 4.2% drank alcohol.

Minorities comprised about 23% of the total population of the district. Barabanki is a category "A" district (i.e. having socio-economic and basic amenities parameters below the national average).

Religion

Hinduism is the largest religion. Islam is a large minority, and is in equal proportions with Hinduism in urban areas.

Languages

At the time of the 2011 Census of India, 91.54% of the district population spoke Hindi (or a related language), 6.16% Urdu and 2.11% Awadhi as their first language.

One of the many languages spoken in the district is Awadhi, a vernacular in the Hindi continuum spoken by over 38 million people, mainly in the Awadh region of India.

Economy
The district's economy is primarily based on agriculture. Agriculture, bio-gas plants, animal husbandry, and small-scale industries provide direct and indirect employment.

Agriculture

In Barabanki the net irrigated area is 84.2% (compared to the Uttar Pradesh average of 79%). The intensity of irrigation in Barabanki is 176.9% (compared to the state average of 140%). Most of irrigation in Barabanki is done through private tube wells (69%) and canals (30%).

Subsistence agriculture is practised in Barabanki, with up to five crops rotated per year. The dominant crops are cereals (occupying 68.4 per cent of cropped areas), mainly paddy (rice) (34.4%) and wheat (31.3%). Other crops include pulses (10.1%) and sugarcane 3.6%), and potatoes (2.8%). Wheat, rice and maize are chief food crops of the district. Opium, menthol oil, sugarcane, fruits (mango, banana, etc.), vegetables (potato, tomato, mushroom, etc.), flowers (gladiolus, etc.), spices, etc. are the chief cash crops for export. Barabanki has been major hub of opium production since British rule; the district opium officer, based at Afeem Kothi, is the only one in the state.

Barabanki leads the country in menthol farming, with  under cultivation.

Apart from crop farming, livestock-based farming, broiler farming, and fish cultivation is also prevalent in the district. Bee keeping is practised in the Dewa block of the district.

The district is home to a Regional Agriculture Seed Testing & Demonstration Station of the federal Department of Agriculture. In 2004, a Krishi Vigyan Kendra (KVK, agricultural science centre) was established in the district under Narendra Dev University of Agriculture and Technology. The Institute for Integrated Society Development established a Rural Technology Development and Dissemination Centre in 2002 at Nindura Block of Barabanki District. National Fertilizers Limited has established a Soil Testing Lab in the district. Information and Communication Technologies has a centre in the district.

Cottage industry
 Handicrafts industry
 Handloom industry
 Weaving products including scarfs, shawls and stoles, some of which are exported. These products are broadly categorised as rayon fibre or cotton yarn. Barabanki scarves were displayed at a national handloom expo. Barabanki has also emerged as a handkerchief production hub.
 Embroidery,
Zardozi- In 2013 the Geographical Indication Registry (GIR) accorded the Geographical Indication (GI) registration to the Lucknow Zardozi – the world-renowned textile embroidery from Lucknow. The Zardozi products manufactured in areas in Lucknow and six surrounding districts of Barabanki, Unnao, Sitapur, Rae Bareli, Hardoi and Amethi became a brand and can carry a registered logo to confirm their authenticity.

Industry
There are six industrial areas in the District Barabanki,
 UPSIDC Agro Park, Kursi Road, Barabanki
 Industrial Area, Dewa Road, Barabanki
 Industrial Area, Rasool Panah, Fatehpur, Barabanki
 Mini Industrial Area, Ismailpur, Dewa, Barabanki
 Mini Industrial Area Amarsanda, Barabanki
 Mini Industrial Area Sohilpur, Harkh, Barabanki

The companies and factories include:
 India PolyFibres Limited
The Company is engaged in manufacturing of polyester staple fibre, polyester, and tow with technology from Du Pont, USA.
 U.P. State Spinning Mill, Barabanki
 U.P. State Sugar Corp. Ltd., Barabanki
 DSM Sugar, Rauzagaon, Barabanki, U.P.
 Hally Industries pvt. Ltd., Barabanki – supplies welding electrodes and owns a wire-drawing unit and a rice mill
 J.R. Agro Industries Limited – operates a solvent extraction plant and a vegetable oil refinery.
 J.R. Organics Ltd. (formally Somaiya Organics Ltd.)
 Bharat Rubber Industries – supplies rubber and rubber-related products/
 Shree Shyam Industries, Tehsil Fatehpur

Solar power plant
The first 2 megawatt-capacity solar power plant project of Uttar Pradesh is situated in Sandauli village of Barabanki district, it was inaugurated on 10 May 2012 and become operational in January 2013. The plant was set up by Technical Associates Ltd.

Culture

Cultural heritage 

In 2011–12 almost 2 million people visited the twin sites of Mahadeva temple (Lodheswar Mahadev) and Deva Sharif shrine.

Notable people

 Royalty
 Dr. Raja Rai Rajeshwar Bali (1889–1944), 13th Taluqdar - Rampur Dariyabad, Honorary Magistrate, Barabanki, Minister of Education & Health United Provinces
 Athletes
 K. D. Singh, (2 February 192227 March 1978), field hockey player. He was captain of the gold medal-winning Indian Olympic Hockey team at the 1952 Summer Olympics.
 Beni Prasad Verma,(11 February 1941 – 27 March 2020) was an Indian politician and a member of the Samajwadi Party. Earlier he was with Samajwadi Party of Mulayam Singh Yadav, then he joined Indian National Congress and was elected on its ticket to Lok Sabha in 2009. In 2016 he rejoined Samajwadi Party.
 Atul Verma, won India its first Olympic archery medal, a bronze in the boys' individual archery competition at the 2014 Youth Summer Olympics.
 Religious figures
 Jagjivan Das (born 1727, date of death unknown), founder of the Satnaami branch of Hinduism. He wrote Aagam Paddhati, Agh Vinaash, Gyan Prakash, Maha Pralay, Param Granth, Prem-Path, and Shabd-Sagar.
 Sayyed Salar Sahu Ghazi of Satrikh (died 1200s), who won the recognition of his contemporaries and exerted one of the most powerful influences in Awadh spiritual history.
 Waris Ali Shah, (1819–1905), a Sufi saint from Dewa, was the founder of Warsi order of Sufism and a poet. He wrote Hans-Jawahir.
 Ayatollah Mufti Syed Muhammad Quli Khan – wrote Kintoori, principal Sadr Amin at the British court in Meerut.
 Ayatollah Syed Mir Hamid Hussain Musavi Kintoori Lakhnavi (died 1880) author of Abaqat ul Anwar fi Imamat al Ai'imma al-Athar.
 Maulana Abdul Majid Daryabadi
 Military
 Ibrahim Bek of Dewa.
 Literary
 Khuda Bakhsh Sheikh of Dariyabad, wrote poetry and a biography of Waris Ali Shah.
 Khumār Barabankvi (1919–1999), an Urdu poet and lyricist.
 Mawlwi Abdul Bari Nadwi, was member of first Managing Committee of Darul Mussannefin Shibli Academy
 Majaz Lucknowi is prominent Urdu poet from Barabanki.  He hails from *Rudauli and maternal uncle of famous lyricist Javed Akhtar.
 Politicians
 Rafi Ahmed Kidwai, Freedom Fighter and Congress leader
 Mohsina Kidwai, politician
 Amir Haider, politician
 Beni Prasad Verma, politician, former MP and Ministry of Steel of India
 Panna Lal Punia, former Member of Loksabha from Barabanki (Lok Sabha constituency), politician
 Upendra Singh Rawat, current Member of Loksabha from Barabanki (Lok Sabha constituency), politician
 Akhlaqur Rahman Kidwai, politician
 Anantram Jaiswal, politician
 Others
 Shaikh Abd al-Quddus Gangohi (1456–1537) bin Shaykh Muhammad Ismail bin Shaykh safi al-djn Hanafi Ghaznavi Chishti Gangohi, a Sufi Shaykh.
 Seyyed Ahmad Musavi Hindi, paternal grandfather of Ayatollah Khomeini, was born in Kintoor.
 Naseeruddin Shah, an actor was born in 1950 in Barabanki.
 Shiva Balak Misra, geologist, writer and social worker 
 Mushirul Hasan,:originally belongs to village Muhammadpur, Tehsil Fatehpur, historian, author and ex-Vice-Chancellor of Jamia Millia Islamia University at Delhi.

Education

Schools and intermediate colleges

 Anand Bhawan School, Barabanki city
 Government Inter College, Barabanki city
 Jawahar Navodaya Vidyalaya, Sonikpur, Trivediganj, Barabanki
 Ram Sewak Yadav Smarak Inter College, Barabanki city
 Pioneer Montessori Inter College, Barabanki city
 Saint Anthony's Inter College, Barabanki city
 Saraswati Shishu Mandir, Barabanki city
 Saraswati Vidya Mandir Inter College, Barabanki city
 Shiv Ram Singh Inter College, Pallhari Bypass, Barabanki

Engineering colleges
 Jahangirabad Institute of Technology, Jahangirabad
 Sagar Institute of Technology & Management, Faizabad Road

Polytechnic institute
 Government Polytechnic Barabanki, Jahangirabad Road

Other professional institutions
 Jahangirabad Media Institute, Jahangirabad

Research institutions
 International Rice Research Institute - branch Tikarhar Road, Kursi, Barabanki

References

External links 

 

 
Districts of Uttar Pradesh
Faizabad division
Awadh
Minority Concentrated Districts in India